Shakti is an Indian comic book character, one of a number of titles published by Raj Comics. Her special powers include fire and a third eye.

Origin
Chanda is the host for the spirit of Shakti. Chanda was an ordinary housewife, until one day she discovered that her husband had been killing her daughters. The monstrosity and injustice of it all opens up the volcano of anger in her, sending the smoke to the heavens. 
The Goddess Kali uses Chanda's body to transform into Shakti, to deliver justice.
Chanda killed her husband in the form of Shakti. 
Chanda keeps herself busy in hospital and social works. She has a third eye which is the sign of the Goddess Kali, but keepsit covered with a headband which she pretends to use to cure her permanent migraine.
She is similar to Thor from Marvel comics, who lived as the mortal doctor Donald Blake for a time.

Plot summary
Shakti is Goddess Kali's transcending incarnation. Kali is the destroyer of demons and the last word in woman-power. She has a raging desire to get justice for women in this man's world. 
The distress cries from any woman, anywhere in the world, turn her ordinary self of Chanda into a ferocious killer known as Shakti.
Shakti is Maha Kali - Great Kali.

Attributes
Chanda, the housewife, is extremely simple and not very much educated. She lacks sex appeal, due to which she was disliked by her former husband. Her alter ego, Shakti, on the other hand, does not tolerate injustice and crime at all and is also strikingly beautiful. Although considered hotheaded and arrogant, she is gracious enough to generate love in people's hearts for one another. Physically, she is blue in colour, stands 5 feet and 7 inches in height and weighs about 50 kg.

Powers & Abilities

She has power of anger of women of the world. She can sense any woman's cry and pain in the world and can turn into light and travel at the speed of light. The incredible amount of energy in her, when released, melts all metals and instantly molds it into shapes and designs as projected by Shakti's mind . When she opens her third eye, situated on her forehead, in anger it beams infernos to burn down the cause of her rage. She is physically the strongest character in the Raj comics universe. She could even carry an airplane with ease and can travel with it at the speed of light. In TRIKALI comic she did time travel to go to the past with her super speed. She also has superhuman strength and endurance.

Enemies

All the other raj comics superheroes. Though, in her initial comics, she fought most of them because of some coincidental misunderstanding,
later she became a member of "brahmand rakshak" a superheroes community similar to "justice league" in the DC Universe.

Titles

Raj Comics has published Total 97 Titles on Shakti till now. A list can be viewed here

SPCL	111	Doga Shakti

GENL	880	Aayi Musibat

GENL	883	Zinda Patthar

SPCL	115	Parmanu Shakti

SPCL	106	Baambi

SPCL	116	Dhruva Shakti

GENL	908	Amanush

GENL	918	Aadhi Aurat

GENL	909	Aayi Shakti

GENL	914	Vardi Wali Aurat

GENL	919	Pawanputri

GENL	924	Maut ke Deewane

GENL	934	Joker

GENL	944	Khabardar Shahri

GENL	948	Puja Express

GENL	964	Chorni

GENL	978	Advocate Madhuri

SPCL	137	Kalyug

GENL	988	Border

GENL	991	Wonder Women

GENL	993	Phool Aur Kante

GENL	1001	Saare Jahan Se Uncha

GENL	1015	Mahabala

SPCL	160	Zero G

GENL	1033	Chingari

SPCL	173	Nash Ketu

SPCL	175	Aa Shakti Aa Parmanu

GENL	1056	Yogini

SPCL	185	Kohram

GENL	1069	Maang Mein Angarein

GENL	1077	Dayan

GENL	1091	Maa

GENL	1094	Sharir Chhalni

GENL	1104	Ganga Jamuna Saraswati

GENL	1116	Yogmaya

GENL	1125	Andhak

GENL	1133	Shakti Help Me

GENL	1137	Nishachari

SPCL	235	Jaljala

GENL	1144	Ladai

GENL	1149	Panch Bhoot

SPCL	240	Bachao bachao

SPCL	244	Mumbai Pareshan

SPCL	250	Death Dot Com

GENL	1160	Speed Meri Dushman

GENL	1171	Mahavinashak

SPCL	265	Itna Bada Kobi

GENL	1178	Shakti Khatm

GENL	1181	Bacha Duniya

GENL	1191	Khatra Uthana Padega

GENL	1197	Tera Kaal

SPCL	303	Morcha

GENL	1201	Nashini

SPCL	308	Antim Yudh

GENL	1205	Bhairavi

SPCL	318	Bharhamand Rakshak

GENL	1211	Mayavi

GENL	1214	Krodh

SPCL	340	Jag Utha Shaitan

GENL	1222	Kali Chaya

SPCL	342	Operation Mangal

GENL	1227	Maut Ka Mazak

SPCL	354	Phir Aaya Ithihas

GENL	1231	Pretaa

GENL	1234	Tabahi

GENL	1237	Maut Ke Putle

SPCL	376	Aa Maut Mujhe Maar

SPCL	379	Pratibandh

SPCL	384	Char Chandaal

SPCL	390	Pakistan Zindabad

SPCL	391	Sava Lakh Se Ek Ladaun

SPCL	393	Jadugar

SPCL	394	Mujhe Chaand Chahiye

SPCL	407	Maharani

SPCL	408	Totka

SPCL	416	Kaal dharpan

SPCL	420	Kolahal

SPCL	430	Daav Par Duniya

SPCL	436	Yug Hatyara

SPCL	448	Jaal Aur Chaal

SPCL	459	Kalsarpa

SPCL	473	Baap Ka Raaj Hai

SPCL	486	Nash

SPCL	504	Anhoni na ho Jaye

SPCL	509	Trikali

SPCL	522	Kaal aur Doga

SPCL	533	Kaal Aur Kali

SPCL	525	Sarv Shaktimaan

SPCL	557	Bhujangnath

SPCL	567	Gulvira

SPCL	579	Woh Chehra

SPCL	592	Vidhwa ka Pati

SPCL	585	Chakra

SPCL	619	Bankelal aur Kalyug

SPCL	636	Villain Chacha

SPCL	696	Palda

SPCL	2233	Ek Se Badhkar Ek

Other Appearances
Fang Magazine
World Comics & Graphic Novels News (WCGNN)
Shakti (Trendy Baba Series, Book # 03) 
Indian Comics Fandom Magazine
Vigyapans (Trendy Baba Series, Book # 07)

Discussion Forum
Raj Comics hosts a discussion forum, with a section specially devoted to Shakti.
Forum by Raj Comics

References

External links
Raj Comics

Indian comics
Raj Comics superheroes
Fictional Indian people
Indian superheroes
Comics about women
Feminist comics
Female characters in comics
Fictional goddesses
Indian mythology in popular culture
Hindu mythology in popular culture